Panningen is a Dutch town with a population of 7,618 inhabitants (2020) and is the biggest village of the municipality Peel en Maas. It is centrally located between the cities of Roermond, Weert and Venlo in the north of the Dutch province Limburg. Before the 2010 municipal redivision, when Panningen became a part of the newly formed municipality of Peel en Maas, it was part of Helden. Together with Helden, Panningen forms a double core, the double core Helden-Panningen has 13,863 inhabitants (2020). Its nearest city, Venlo, lies about 13 km eastwards.

The built-up area of the town is 3.38 km², and contains 4523 residences.

Gallery

References

Populated places in Limburg (Netherlands)
Peel en Maas